The Paul Revere Masonic Temple was a Masonic Temple built in Chicago, Illinois in 1880 as a residential home, at 1521 West Wilson Avenue. In 1899 became the Ravenswood Women’s Club with an addition later., it was made out of wood, it was a two stories building, with a large front porch and a large lawn on the Ashland Avenue side. The building had 7 bedrooms, 2 meeting rooms, reception hall with dance floor and sitting room, also billiards and bowling alley.

In 1920 the Grand Templars of Illinois invited Paul Revere Lodge to join them in the ownership of the temple, and then after a few years they offered to sell it to Paul Revere Lodge. One unique feature was that the wooden window shutters all had the Square and Compasses cut in them.

In 2004 the Landmark designation was approved by the Commission on Chicago Landmarks, but not by the owners at that time, under the Religious Buildings Ordinance.

In 2006 became the Vietnamese Buddhist Chùa Trúc Lâm Temple.

In 2017 it was demolished after Preservation Chicago could not find a buyer to preserve the historic structure.

In 2021 a new building opened as The Gardner School with a new address number listed as 1525 West Wilson Avenue.

See also 

 Masonic Temple (Chicago) Former Masonic buildings in Illinois
 Jefferson Masonic Temple Masonic buildings in Illinois

References 

Former Masonic buildings in Illinois
Former buildings and structures in Chicago
Masonic buildings completed in 1880
Buildings and structures demolished in 2017
2017 disestablishments in Illinois
Demolished buildings and structures in Chicago
1880 establishments in Illinois